Alice Carlotta Degradi (born 10 May 1996) is an Italian volleyball player for Cuneo Granda and the Italian national team.

Career 
She participated at the 2015 FIVB Volleyball Women's U23 World Championship,  and 2018 FIVB Volleyball Women's Nations League.

Clubs 

 2011-2012	Villanterio Villanterio
 2012-2016	Busto Arsizio Busto Arsizio
 2016-2017	Pesaro Pesaro
 2017-2018	SAB SAB
 2018-	San Casciano

References

External links 
 
 

1996 births
Living people
Italian women's volleyball players
Competitors at the 2018 Mediterranean Games
Mediterranean Games competitors for Italy
21st-century Italian women